The Rosary (also The Two Devotions) is a 1911 silent film romantic short directed by R.F. Baker aka Richard Foster Baker and starring Francis X. Bushman. It was produced by the Essanay Film Manufacturing Company and distributed by the General Film Company.

Cast
Francis X. Bushman - young Payne
Dorothy Phillips - Ruth Martin

See also
Francis X. Bushman filmography

References

External links
 The Rosary at IMDb.com

1911 films
American silent short films
1911 short films
Essanay Studios films
American romance films
1910s romance films
American black-and-white films
1910s American films
1910s English-language films